Blind Ride is Hibria's third album, released in 2011.

Track listing

Credits
 Iuri Sanson - Vocals
 Diego Kasper - Guitars
 Abel Camargo - Guitars
 Benhur Lima - Bass
 Eduardo Baldo - Drums
 All songs performed by Abel Camargo, Diego Kasper, Iuri Sanson, Eduardo Baldo, Benhur Lima
 Mixed and Mastered at Machine Shop - New York/USA by William Putney
 Vocals and Drums recorded at Imagem Sonora - Porto Alegre/Brazil by Carlos Loureiro and Juliano
 Additional Backing vocals: Benhur Lima - Nonconforming Minds, Tough Is The Way
 Guitars and bass guitar recorded at Hibria Studios, reamped at Machine Shop
 Cover art and booklet by Gustavo Sazes. 3D modeling by Diego Kasper. Band Picture: Guto Maahs

References

2011 albums